Dimitroff may refer to

 Tom Dimitroff, Sr. -- Gridiron football player and coach
 Thomas Dimitroff -- Gridiron football scout and general manager of the Atlanta Falcons
 Dimitrov (surname)